Struebingianella is a genus of true bugs belonging to the family Delphacidae.

Species:
 Struebingianella detecta (Linnavuori, 1953) 
 Struebingianella rasnitsyni Anufriev, 1980

References

Delphacidae